UFC on ESPN: Błachowicz vs. Rakić (also known as UFC on ESPN 36 and UFC Vegas 54) was a mixed martial arts event produced by the Ultimate Fighting Championship that took place on May 14, 2022, at the UFC Apex facility in Enterprise, Nevada, part of the Las Vegas Metropolitan Area, United States.

Background
A light heavyweight bout between former KSW and UFC Light Heavyweight Champion Jan Błachowicz and Aleksandar Rakić served as the event headliner. They were previously scheduled to headline UFC on ESPN: Blaydes vs. Daukaus, but Błachowicz withdrew due to an injury and the bout was cancelled.

A women's flyweight bout between former Strikeforce and UFC Women's Bantamweight Champion Miesha Tate and former Invicta FC Bantamweight Champion (also former UFC Women's Flyweight Championship challenger) Lauren Murphy was expected to take place at this event. However, the bout was moved to UFC 276 due to unknown reasons.

Ryan Spann and Ion Cuțelaba met in a light heavyweight bout at the event. The pair was previously scheduled to fight at UFC Fight Night: Makhachev vs. Green, but Spann was pulled due to injury.

A flyweight bout between Jake Hadley and Allan Nascimento took place at the event. The pair was previously scheduled to meet at UFC Fight Night: Volkov vs. Aspinall, but the bout was cancelled due to Hadley's injury.

Louis Smolka and Davey Grant were expected to meet in a bantamweight bout at UFC on ESPN: Ngannou vs. Rozenstruik in March 2020, but the event was cancelled due to the COVID-19 pandemic. They eventually met at this event.

A lightweight bout between Michael Johnson and Alan Patrick was originally scheduled to take place one week prior at UFC 274, but it was pushed back to this event due to unknown reasons.

Daniel Pineda and Jamall Emmers were expected to meet in a featherweight bout. However, the bout was scrapped in late April due to unknown reasons.

A flyweight bout between Tatsuro Taira and Carlos Candelario was expected to take place two weeks earlier at UFC on ESPN: Font vs. Vera. However, it was scratched just hours before taking place due to Candelario suffering from an illness. They were then rescheduled for this event.

Results

Bonus awards
The following fighters received $50,000 bonuses.
 Fight of the Night: Katlyn Chookagian vs. Amanda Ribas
 Performance of the Night: Ryan Spann and Manuel Torres

See also 

 List of UFC events
 List of current UFC fighters
 2022 in UFC

References 

UFC on ESPN
2022 in mixed martial arts
May 2022 sports events in the United States
2022 in sports in Nevada
Mixed martial arts in Las Vegas
Sports competitions in Las Vegas